Jennifer Brady (born 1995) is an American tennis player.

Jennifer Brady may also refer to:

 Jennifer Brady (politician), member of the Ohio House of Representatives
 Jennifer Brady, a character in the 1989 film Ten Little Indians